Bârsești is a commune located in Vrancea County, Western Moldavia, Romania. It is composed of two villages, Bârsești and Topești, and also included Negrilești before it split off as a separate commune in 2003.

The commune is located in the hilly area of the county, on the middle course of the river Putna. It is crossed by the national road DN2D that connects Focșani and Târgu Secuiesc.

References

Communes in Vrancea County
Localities in Western Moldavia